The Executive of the 1st Northern Ireland Assembly (1 July 1998 – 14 October 2002) was, under the terms of the Northern Ireland Act 1998, a power-sharing coalition.

Following the first election to the new Northern Ireland Assembly the Ulster Unionist Party, the Social Democratic and Labour Party and Sinn Féin all took up their ministerial posts and formed an executive, the Democratic Unionist Party refused to attend meetings of the Executive Committee in protest at Sinn Féin's participation.

Full power was devolved to the Executive on 2 December 1999. This power was revoked by the Secretary of State on four separate occasions. The first was for a period of 3 months from 11 February 2000 – 30 May 2000 because of no arms decommissioning. The next two times were for periods of 24 hours on 10 August 2001 to help deal with arms negotiations and 21 September 2001 following the Holy Cross dispute. The final suspension came on 14 October 2002 after the Stormontgate controversy surrounding an alleged Provisional Irish Republican Army spy ring based in Stormont.

1st Executive of Northern Ireland

See also
List of Northern Ireland Executives
Members of the Northern Ireland Assembly elected in 2007

Northern Ireland Executive
Northern Ireland, Executive of the Northern Ireland Assembly 1st
Ministries of the Northern Ireland Assembly
1998 establishments in Northern Ireland
2002 disestablishments in Northern Ireland
Cabinets established in 1998
Cabinets disestablished in 2002
Ministries of Elizabeth II